is a participant of the 'third generation' of the Gutai Art Association from the mid 1960s onward. Her paintings are often characterized by an inorganic composition, seemingly devoid of emotional expression. Kanno is also a member of an experimental, avant-garde group of poets, in which she composed highly visual poems using symbols and katakana syllables. Her work additionally suggests her admiration of music, physics and mathematics, to which she became devoted towards in her later years.

Biography 
Seiko Kanno was born in Sendai, Japan in 1933. She began painting and composing poems in high school. Kanno graduated from the Faculty of Human Development and Culture at Fukushima University where she often entered her abstract paintings into publicly sponsored exhibitions. Kanno began working with collage upon moving to Kobe, using newspaper and cardboard. Starting in 1964, she began showing her work to Gutai Art exhibitions, becoming an official member in 1968.  She returned to painting in the late 60's. In 1965, Kanno moved to Tokyo along with her husband who had been transferred there for work. In Tokyo, she joined an art study group, led by poet Seiichi Niikuni, where she composed semiotic poems and began to introduce geometrical patterns in her paintings, calling these works  (code poetry).

In later years, Kanno audited university classes in physics and mathematics at Kyoto University, Kwansei Gakuin University, and elsewhere. Much of her later works specifically draw inspiration from these subjects.

Selected exhibitions

Solo

Group

Writings 
Seiko Kanno published an anthology titled Mr. SU in 1971, through the National Museum of Art, Osaka.

References 

1933 births
1988 deaths
Fukushima University alumni
Artists from Miyagi Prefecture
Writers from Miyagi Prefecture
People from Sendai